John Gneisenau Neihardt (January 8, 1881 – November 3, 1973) was an American writer and poet, amateur historian and ethnographer. Born at the end of the American settlement of the Plains, he became interested in the lives of those who had been a part of the European-American migration, as well as the Indigenous peoples whom they had displaced.

His best-known work is Black Elk Speaks (1932), which Neihardt presents as an extended narration of the visions of the Lakota medicine man Black Elk.  It was translated into German as Ich rufe mein Volk (I Call My People) (1953). In the United States, the book was reprinted in 1961, at the beginning of an increase in non-Native interest in Native American cultures. Its widespread popularity has supported four other editions. In 2008 the State University of New York published the book in a premier, annotated edition.

Biography

Neihardt was born in Sharpsburg, Illinois. He published his first book, The Divine Enchantment, at the age of 19. The book is based on Hindu mysticism.

In 1901, Neihardt moved to Bancroft, Nebraska, on the edge of the Omaha Reservation, beginning a lifelong fascination with Indian cultures. He also co-owned and edited the local newspaper, the Bancroft Blade. After a trip to the Black Hills, Neihardt published A Bundle of Myrrh, romantic poetry in free verse.

In 1920, Neihardt moved to Branson, Missouri. In the summer of 1930, as part of his research into the American Indian Ghost Dance movement, Neihardt contacted an Oglala holy man named Black Elk. Neihardt developed the book Black Elk Speaks from their conversations, which continued in the spring of 1931, and published it in 1932. It is now Neihardt's best known work. The book was translated into German in 1953.  In the United States, it was reprinted in 1961 and there have been four additional editions. In 2008 the State University of New York Press published a premier edition of the book, with annotations.

Neihardt served as a professor of poetry at the University of Nebraska, and a literary editor in St. Louis, Missouri. He was a poet-in-residence and lecturer at the University of Missouri in Columbia, Missouri from 1948 on.

In 1971 and 1972 Neihardt appeared on The Dick Cavett Show, spurring renewed interest in Black Elk Speaks.

Neihardt died in 1973.

Legacy and honors

A Residence Hall at Wayne State College in Wayne, NE is also named after Neihardt. It is rumored to be haunted.
An elementary school in Omaha, Nebraska is named after Neihardt.
A park in Blair, NE is named for Black Elk, an Oglala Lakota and John G. Neihardt who wrote Black Elk Speaks.

Bibliography
The Divine Enchantment, 1900. 
2008 edition, SUNY Press. 
A Bundle of Myrrh, 1907. 
2008 edition, SUNY Press. 
Man-Song, 1909. 
2008 edition, SUNY Press. 
The River and I, 1910. 
2008 edition, SUNY Press. 
Life's Lure, 1914. 
The Song of Hugh Glass, (Cycle) 1915
2008 edition, SUNY Press. 
The Quest, 1916.
2008 edition, SUNY Press. 
The Song of Three Friends, (Cycle) 1919
2008 edition, SUNY Press. 
The Splendid Wayfaring, 1920. 
 2008 edition, SUNY Press. 
The Song of the Indian Wars, (Cycle) 1925
Indian Tales and Others, 1926. 
2008 edition, SUNY Press. 
Black Elk Speaks, 1932, William Morrow & Company
1961 new preface by author, University of Nebraska Press
1979 introduction by Vine Deloria, Jr.
1988 edition: 
2000 edition with index: 
The Premier Edition, 2008, SUNY Press: 
"The Complete Edition," 2014, University of Nebraska Press: 424 pp. 
The Song of the Messiah, (Cycle) 1935
The Song of Jed Smith, (Cycle) 1941
A Cycle of the West, 1949. 
When the Tree Flowered, 1952. 
All is But a Beginning, 1972. 
Patterns and Coincidences, 1978 (posthumous). 
John G Neihardt Black Elk Speaks Stereo LP Box Set, 1973 (posthumous recording).UA-LA157-j3-1198

See also

American writers
American philosophy
List of American philosophers

References

Further reading
Clyde Holler, editor. Black Elk Reader, Syracuse University Press (2000).
Hilda Neihardt, Black Elk and Flaming Rainbow: Personal Memories of the Lakota Holy Man and John Neihardt (1999)
Neihardt; R. Todd Wise, "Black Elk and John Neihardt", in Black Elk Reader, edited by Clyde Holler, Syracuse University Press (2000).
Hilda Neihardt, The Broidered Garment: The Love Story of Mona Martinsen and John G. Neihardt (2006)

External links

John G. Neihardt State Historical Site
 
 
 
John G. Neihardt Collection at the University of Missouri Division of Special Collections and Rare Books
Neihardt, John G. (1881–1973), Papers, 1908–1974 (C3778) at the State Historical Society of Missouri

1881 births
1973 deaths
20th-century American male writers
20th-century American non-fiction writers
Ethnographers
Poets from Illinois
Poets from Missouri
Poets from Nebraska
University of Missouri faculty
University of Nebraska–Lincoln faculty
Writers from St. Louis
Poets Laureate of Nebraska
19th-century American poets
American male poets
20th-century American poets
19th-century American male writers
People from Christian County, Illinois
People from Wayne, Nebraska
American male non-fiction writers
20th-century American philosophers